Acer fabri, or Faber's maple, is a species of evergreen maple shrub native to Vietnam and central to southern China (Guangdong, Guangxi, Guizhou, Hainan, Hubei, Hunan, Jiangxi, Sichuan, Yunnan).

Acer fabri is a shrub rarely more than 1 meter tall. It has with unlobed, lance-shaped leaves, unlike the multilobed leaves found on most maple species. Newly grown leaves and samaras take on a reddish hue. It was collected by the Rev. Ernst Faber and described by Henry Fletcher Hance.

References

fabri
Flora of China
Flora of Vietnam
Plants described in 1884
Taxa named by Henry Fletcher Hance